Kateřina Novotná (born 12 August 1984) is a Czech short-track speed-skater and  long track speed skater.

Long track speed skating
As a long track speed skater she was, who was active between 1995 and 2016.

As a junior she became national champion in 1997 (allround) and in 2005 (500 metres). At elite level she won the bronze medal at the 2009 Czech Allround Championships. She represented her nation at the 2011 European Speed Skating Championships, finishing 19th overall. She also competed at other international competitions, including at ISU Speed Skating World Cups.

Personal records

Short track speed skating
Novotná competed at the 2002, 2006  and 2010 Winter Olympics for the Czech Republic. In 2002, she finished fourth in her opening round race of both the 500 metres and the 1000 metres, failing to advance. In the 1500 metres she finished third in her first race, and advanced to the semifinals, where she finished fifth, failing to advance further.
 
In 2006, she finished third in her opening round race of the 1000 metres, failing to advance. In the 1500 metres she finished third in the opening round, and advanced to the semifinals, where she finished fifth, failing to advance. In the 500 metres she finished second in her opening round heat, won her quarterfinal, then placed fourth in her semifinal to advance to the B Final. She placed 3rd in the B Final, and 6th overall, her best Olympic result.
 
In 2010, she finished fourth in the first round of the 1000 metres, failing to advance. In the 1500 metres, she finished third in the opening heat, advancing to the quarterfinals, where she was disqualified. In the 500 metres, she finished second in her opening round heat, then third in her quarterfinal, failing to advance to the semifinals.

As of 2013, Novotná's best finish at the World Championships is 5th, in the 500 metres in 2009, when she came 11th in the 500 metres. She also won a gold medal as a member of the Czech relay team at the 2010 European Championships.

As of 2013, Novotná has one ISU Short Track Speed Skating World Cup podium finish, a bronze in the 1500 metres in 2006–07 at Changchun. Her top World Cup ranking is 4th, in the 1500 metres in 2006–07.

World Cup Podiums

References

External links 
 

1984 births
Living people
Czech female speed skaters
Czech female short track speed skaters
Short track speed skaters at the 2002 Winter Olympics
Short track speed skaters at the 2006 Winter Olympics
Short track speed skaters at the 2010 Winter Olympics
Short track speed skaters at the 2014 Winter Olympics
Olympic short track speed skaters of the Czech Republic
Sportspeople from Mladá Boleslav